A trans-Neptunian object (TNO), also written transneptunian object, is any minor planet in the Solar System that orbits the Sun at a greater average distance than Neptune, which has a semi-major axis of 30.1 astronomical units (au).

Typically, TNOs are further divided into the classical and resonant objects of the Kuiper belt, the scattered disc and detached objects with the sednoids being the most distant ones. As of October 2020, the catalog of minor planets contains 678 numbered and more than 2,000 unnumbered TNOs.

The first trans-Neptunian object to be discovered was Pluto in 1930. It took until 1992 to discover a second trans-Neptunian object orbiting the Sun directly, 15760 Albion. More than 80 satellites have been discovered in orbit of trans-Neptunian objects. TNOs vary in color and are either grey-blue (BB) or very red (RR). They are thought to be composed of mixtures of rock, amorphous carbon and volatile ices such as water and methane, coated with tholins and other organic compounds.

Twelve minor planets with a semi-major axis greater than 150 au and perihelion greater than 30 au are known, which are called extreme trans-Neptunian objects (ETNOs).

History

Discovery of Pluto 

The orbit of each of the planets is slightly affected by the gravitational influences of the other planets. Discrepancies in the early 1900s between the observed and expected orbits of Uranus and Neptune suggested that there were one or more additional planets beyond Neptune. The search for these led to the discovery of Pluto in February 1930, which was too small to explain the discrepancies. Revised estimates of Neptune's mass from the Voyager 2 flyby in 1989 showed that the problem was spurious. Pluto was easiest to find because it has the highest apparent magnitude of all known trans-Neptunian objects. It also has a lower inclination to the ecliptic than most other large TNOs.

Subsequent discoveries 
After Pluto's discovery, American astronomer Clyde Tombaugh continued searching for some years for similar objects, but found none. For a long time, no one searched for other TNOs as it was generally believed that Pluto, which up to August 2006 was classified a planet, was the only major object beyond Neptune. Only after the 1992 discovery of a second TNO, 15760 Albion, did systematic searches for further such objects begin. A broad strip of the sky around the ecliptic was photographed and digitally evaluated for slowly moving objects. Hundreds of TNOs were found, with diameters in the range of 50 to 2,500 kilometers. Eris, the most massive TNO, was discovered in 2005, revisiting a long-running dispute within the scientific community over the classification of large TNOs, and whether objects like Pluto can be considered planets. Pluto and Eris were eventually classified as dwarf planets by the International Astronomical Union. Farout is the most distant solar system object so-far observed and is about 120 au away from the sun. It takes 738 years to complete one orbit.

Classification 

According to their distance from the Sun and their orbital parameters, TNOs are classified in two large groups: the Kuiper belt objects (KBOs) and the scattered disc objects (SDOs). The diagram to the right illustrates the distribution of known trans-Neptunian objects (up to 70 au) in relation to the orbits of the planets and the centaurs for reference. Different classes are represented in different colours. Resonant objects (including Neptune trojans) are plotted in red, classical Kuiper belt objects in blue. The scattered disc extends to the right, far beyond the diagram, with known objects at mean distances beyond 500 au (Sedna) and aphelia beyond 1,000 .

KBOs 
The Edgeworth-Kuiper belt contains objects with an average distance to the Sun of 30 to about 55 au, usually having close-to-circular orbits with a small inclination from the ecliptic. Edgeworth-Kuiper belt objects are further classified into the resonant trans-Neptunian object, that are locked in an orbital resonance with Neptune, and the classical Kuiper belt objects, also called "cubewanos", that have no such resonance, moving on almost circular orbits, unperturbed by Neptune. There are a large number of resonant subgroups, the largest being the twotinos (1:2 resonance) and the plutinos (2:3 resonance), named after their most prominent member, Pluto. Members of the classical Edgeworth-Kuiper belt include 15760 Albion, 50000 Quaoar and Makemake.

Another subclass of Kuiper belt objects is the so-called scattering objects (SO). These are non-resonant objects that come near enough to Neptune to have their orbits changed from time to time (such as causing changes in semi-major axis of at least 1.5 AU in 10 million years), and are thus undergoing gravitational scattering. Scattering objects are easier to detect than other trans-Neptunian objects of the same size because they come nearer to Earth, some having perihelia around 20 AU. Several are known with g-band absolute magnitude below 9, meaning that the estimated diameter is more than 100 km. It is estimated that there are between 240,000 and 830,000 scattering objects bigger than r-band absolute magnitude 12, corresponding to diameters greater than about 18 km. Scattering objects are hypothesized to be the source of the so-called Jupiter-family comets (JFCs), which have periods of less than 20 years.

SDOs 
The scattered disc contains objects farther from the Sun, with very eccentric and inclined orbits. These orbits are non-resonant and non-planetary-orbit-crossing. A typical example is the most-massive-known TNO, Eris. Based on the Tisserand parameter relative to Neptune (TN), the objects in the scattered disc can be further divided into the "typical" scattered disc objects (SDOs, Scattered-near) with a TN of less than 3, and into the detached objects (ESDOs, Scattered-extended) with a TN greater than 3. In addition, detached objects have a time-averaged eccentricity greater than 0.2 The Sednoids are a further extreme sub-grouping of the detached objects with perihelia so distant that it is confirmed that their orbits cannot be explained by perturbations from the giant planets, nor by interaction with the galactic tides.

Physical characteristics 

Given the apparent magnitude (>20) of all but the biggest trans-Neptunian objects, the physical studies are limited to the following:
 thermal emissions for the largest objects (see size determination)
 colour indices, i.e. comparisons of the apparent magnitudes using different filters
 analysis of spectra, visual and infrared

Studying colours and spectra provides insight into the objects' origin and a potential correlation with other classes of objects, namely centaurs and some satellites of giant planets (Triton, Phoebe), suspected to originate in the Kuiper belt. However, the interpretations are typically ambiguous as the spectra can fit more than one model of the surface composition and depend on the unknown particle size. More significantly, the optical surfaces of small bodies are subject to modification by intense radiation, solar wind and micrometeorites. Consequently, the thin optical surface layer could be quite different from the regolith underneath, and not representative of the bulk composition of the body.

Small TNOs are thought to be low-density mixtures of rock and ice with some organic (carbon-containing) surface material such as tholin, detected in their spectra. The composition of some small TNOs could be similar to that of comets. Indeed, some centaurs undergo seasonal changes when they approach the Sun, making the boundary blurred (see 2060 Chiron and 7968 Elst–Pizarro). However, population comparisons between centaurs and TNOs are still controversial.

Color indices  

Colour indices are simple measures of the differences in the apparent magnitude of an object seen through blue (B), visible (V), i.e. green-yellow, and red (R) filters. The diagram illustrates known colour indices for all but the biggest objects (in slightly enhanced colour).
For reference, two moons: Triton and Phoebe, the centaur Pholus and the planet Mars are plotted (yellow labels, size not to scale). Correlations between the colours and the orbital characteristics have been studied, to confirm theories of different origin of the different dynamic classes:
 Classical Kuiper belt object (cubewano) seem to be composed of two different colour populations: the so-called cold (inclination <5°) population, displaying only red colours, and the so-called hot (higher inclination) population displaying the whole range of colours from blue to very red. A recent analysis based on the data from Deep Ecliptic Survey confirms this difference in colour between low-inclination (named Core) and high-inclination (named Halo) objects. Red colours of the Core objects together with their unperturbed orbits suggest that these objects could be a relic of the original population of the belt.
Scattered disc objects show colour resemblances with hot classical objects pointing to a common origin.

While the relatively dimmer bodies, as well as the population as the whole, are reddish (V−I = 0.3–0.6), the bigger objects are often more neutral in colour (infrared index V−I < 0.2). This distinction leads to suggestion that the surface of the largest bodies is covered with ices, hiding the redder, darker areas underneath.

Spectral type 

Among TNOs, as among centaurs, there is a wide range of colors from blue-grey (neutral) to very red, but unlike the centaurs, bimodally grouped into grey and red centaurs, the distribution for TNOs appears to be uniform. The wide range of spectra differ in reflectivity in visible red and near infrared. Neutral objects present a flat spectrum, reflecting as much red and infrared as visible spectrum. Very red objects present a steep slope, reflecting much more in red and infrared.
A recent attempt at classification (common with centaurs) uses the total of four classes from BB (blue, or neutral color, average B−V  0.70, V−R  0.39, e.g. Orcus) to RR (very red, B−V  1.08, V−R  0.71, e.g. Sedna) with BR and IR as intermediate classes. BR (intermediate blue-red) and IR (moderately red) differ mostly in the infrared bands I, J and H.

Typical models of the surface include water ice, amorphous carbon, silicates and organic macromolecules, named tholins, created by intense radiation. Four major tholins are used to fit the reddening slope:
 Titan tholin, believed to be produced from a mixture of 90% N2 (nitrogen) and 10%  (methane)
 Triton tholin, as above but with very low (0.1%) methane content
 (ethane) Ice tholin I, believed to be produced from a mixture of 86%  and 14% C2H6 (ethane)
 (methanol) Ice tholin II, 80% H2O, 16% CH3OH (methanol) and 3% 
As an illustration of the two extreme classes BB and RR, the following compositions have been suggested
 for Sedna (RR very red): 24% Triton tholin, 7% carbon, 10% N2, 26% methanol, and 33% methane
 for Orcus (BB, grey/blue): 85% amorphous carbon, +4% Titan tholin, and 11% H2O ice

Size determination and distribution 

Characteristically, big (bright) objects are typically on inclined orbits, whereas the invariable plane regroups mostly small and dim objects.

It is difficult to estimate the diameter of TNOs. For very large objects, with very well known orbital elements (like Pluto), diameters can be precisely measured by occultation of stars. For other large TNOs, diameters can be estimated by thermal measurements. The intensity of light illuminating the object is known (from its distance to the Sun), and one assumes that most of its surface is in thermal equilibrium (usually not a bad assumption for an airless body). For a known albedo, it is possible to estimate the surface temperature, and correspondingly the intensity of heat radiation. Further, if the size of the object is known, it is possible to predict both the amount of visible light and emitted heat radiation reaching Earth. A simplifying factor is that the Sun emits almost all of its energy in visible light and at nearby frequencies, while at the cold temperatures of TNOs, the heat radiation is emitted at completely different wavelengths (the far infrared).

Thus there are two unknowns (albedo and size), which can be determined by two independent measurements (of the amount of reflected light and emitted infrared heat radiation). Unfortunately, TNOs are so far from the Sun that they are very cold, hence producing black-body radiation around 60 micrometres in wavelength. This wavelength of light is impossible to observe on the Earth's surface, but only from space using, e.g. the Spitzer Space Telescope. For ground-based observations, astronomers observe the tail of the black-body radiation in the far infrared. This far infrared radiation is so dim that the thermal method is only applicable to the largest KBOs. For the majority of (small) objects, the diameter is estimated by assuming an albedo. However, the albedos found range from 0.50 down to 0.05, resulting in a size range of 1,200–3,700 km for an object of magnitude of 1.0.

Notable objects

Exploration 

The only mission to date that primarily targeted a trans-Neptunian object was NASA's New Horizons, which was launched in January 2006 and flew by the Pluto system in July 2015 and 486958 Arrokoth in January 2019.

In 2011, a design study explored a spacecraft survey of Quaoar, Sedna, Makemake, Haumea, and Eris.

In 2019 one mission to TNOs included designs for orbital capture and multi-target scenarios.

The existence of planets beyond Neptune, ranging from less than an Earth mass (Sub-Earth) up to a brown dwarf has been often postulated for different theoretical reasons to explain several observed or speculated features of the Kuiper belt and the Oort cloud. It was recently proposed to use ranging data from the New Horizons spacecraft to constrain the position of such a hypothesized body.

NASA has been working towards a dedicated Interstellar Precursor in the 21st century, one intentionally designed to reach the interstellar medium, and as part of this the flyby of objects like Sedna are also considered. Overall this type of spacecraft studies have proposed a launch in the 2020s, and would try to go a little faster than the Voyagers using existing technology. One 2018 design study for an Interstellar Precursor, included a visit of minor planet 50000 Quaoar, in the 2030s.

Extreme trans-Neptunian objects 

Among the extreme trans-Neptunian objects are three high-perihelion objects classified as sednoids: 90377 Sedna, and 541132 Leleākūhonua. They are distant detached objects with perihelia greater than 70 au. Their high perihelia keep them at a sufficient distance to avoid significant gravitational perturbations from Neptune. Previous explanations for the high perihelion of Sedna include a close encounter with an unknown planet on a distant orbit and a distant encounter with a random star or a member of the Sun's birth cluster that passed near the Solar System.

In fiction
 Pluto in fiction

See also
 Dwarf planet
 Mesoplanet
 Nemesis (hypothetical star)
 Planet Nine
 Sednoid
 Small Solar System body
 Triton
 Tyche (hypothetical planet)

Notes

References

External links 

 Nine planets, University of Arizona
 David Jewitt's Kuiper Belt site
 Large KBO page
 A list of the estimates of the diameters from johnstonarchive with references to the original papers

 
Distant minor planets
Neptune